Lernagog, is a village in the Armavir Province of Armenia. The village was formerly a sovkhoz. The village is sponsored by COAF Children of Armenia Fund and is one of the cleanest villages in Armenia. It has a very good school with the first creativity lab in Armenia.

History 
An 8th century B.C. settlement has been discovered at “Lernagog-1” site near the village. Archaeologists have also discovered traces of a clay construction, which testifies to the fact that people mastered clay architecture.

See also 
Armavir Province

References 

World Gazeteer: Armenia – World-Gazetteer.com

Specific

Populated places in Armavir Province